François Chevalley (16 February 1924 – 22 May 2011) was a Swiss racing cyclist. He rode in the 1953 Tour de France.

References

External links
 

1924 births
2011 deaths
Swiss male cyclists
Place of birth missing
20th-century Swiss people
21st-century Swiss people